Eleanor Rosamund Barraclough is a British cultural historian, broadcaster and writer. She is a lecturer in Environmental History at Bath Spa University. Previously she was an Associate Professor of Medieval History, and Literature at Durham University with particular focus on the history and mythology of the Vikings. She was named a 2013 BBC/AHRC New Generation Thinker and has presented programmes such as BBC Four's Beyond the Walls: In Search of the Celts and hosted the Time Travellers podcast on BBC Radio 3. She acted as a judge for the 2020 Costa Book Award for Biography. and participated in the second episode of the Longborough Festival Opera podcast.

Works

References

External Links 
 Official website

Living people
British women historians
British medievalists
Academics of Durham University
Academics of Bath Spa University
Year of birth missing (living people)